The St. Louis Cardinals 2004 season was the team's 123rd season in St. Louis, Missouri and the 113th season in the National League.  The Cardinals went 105-57 during the season, the most wins of any Cardinals team since 1944, and the first Cardinal team to win 100 or more games since 1985, and won the National League Central division by 13 games over the NL Wild-Card Champion Houston Astros.  In the playoffs the Cardinals defeated the Los Angeles Dodgers 3 games to 1 in the NLDS and the Astros 4 games to 3 in the NLCS to reach their first World Series since 1987.  In the World Series the Cardinals faced the Boston Red Sox and were swept 4 games to 0.  It was the final World Series played at Busch Memorial Stadium. Because the American League had home-field advantage as a result of winning the All-Star Game, Busch Memorial Stadium was where the Curse of the Bambino died.

Catcher Mike Matheny, third baseman Scott Rolen, and outfielder Jim Edmonds won Gold Gloves this year.

The 2004 St. Louis Cardinals were the first team to lose the World Series to a "Moneyball" style team roster on the side of the Red Sox.

Offseason
 December 2, 2003: Signed free agent pitcher Chris Carpenter.
 December 13, 2003:  Traded outfielder J. D. Drew and catcher Eli Marrero to the Atlanta Braves for pitchers Jason Marquis, Ray King, and Adam Wainwright.
 January 10, 2004: Signed free agent pitcher Alan Benes.
 February 12, 2004: Signed free agent John Mabry.

Regular season

Opening Day lineup

Summary
Acquired via trade from the Colorado Rockies on August 6, 2004, Larry Walker, customarily the Rockies' number three hitter, became the Cardinals' number two hitter.  The Cardinals already had Edmonds, Pujols and Rolen in the 3 through 5 spots.  Walker made his Cardinals debut on August 7, playing the New York Mets, and appeared as a pinch-hitter and struck out in the seventh inning.  He drew a walk from Mike Stanton in the ninth inning and scored the game-winning run on a Yadier Molina single.

Season standings

National League Central

Record vs. opponents

Transactions
 August 6: Traded Jason Burch (minors) and players to be named later to the Colorado Rockies for outfielder Larry Walker.  The Cardinals sent pitchers Luís Martínez and Chris Narveson on August 11 to the Rockies to complete the trade.

Game log

|- bgcolor=#ffbbbb
| 1 || April 5 || Brewers || 6–8 || || || || || 0–1
|- bgcolor=#ffbbbb
| 2 || April 6 || Brewers || 5–7 || || || || || 0–2
|- bgcolor=#ccffcc
| 3 || April 7 || Brewers || 9–4 || || || || || 1–2
|- bgcolor=#ffbbbb
| 4 || April 8 || Brewers || 5–11 || || || || || 1–3
|- bgcolor=#ccffcc
| 5 || April 9 || @ Dbacks || 13–6 || || || || || 2–3
|- bgcolor=#ccffcc
| 6 || April 10 || @ Dbacks || 10–2 || || || || || 3–3
|- bgcolor=#ccffcc
| 7 || April 11 || @ Dbacks || 6–5 || || || || || 4–3
|- bgcolor=#ffbbbb
| 8 || April 12 || Astros || 5–10 || || || || || 4–4
|- bgcolor=#ffbbbb
| 9 || April 13 || Astros || 3–5 || || || || || 4–5
|- bgcolor=#ffbbbb
| 10 || April 14 || Astros || 1–11 || || || || || 4–6
|- bgcolor=#ccffcc
| 11 || April 16 || Rockies || 13–5 || || || || || 5–6
|- bgcolor=#ccffcc
| 12 || April 17 || Rockies || 8–4 || || || || || 6–6
|- bgcolor=#ffbbbb
| 13 || April 18 || Rockies || 5–8 || || || || || 6–7
|- bgcolor=#ccffcc
| 14 || April 20 || @ Astros || 5–3 || || || || || 7–7
|- bgcolor=#ccffcc
| 15 || April 21 || @ Astros || 12–6 || || || || || 8–7
|- bgcolor=#ccffcc
| 16 || April 22 || @ Astros || 2–1 || || || || || 9–7
|- bgcolor=#ffbbbb
| 17 || April 23 || @ Brewers || 1–2 || || || || || 9–8
|- bgcolor=#ffbbbb
| 18 || April 24 || @ Brewers || 1–3 || || || || || 9–9
|- bgcolor=#ccffcc
| 19 || April 25 || @ Brewers || 5–2 || || || || || 10–9
|- bgcolor=#ffbbbb
| 20 || April 27 || Phillies || 3–7 || || || || || 10–10
|- bgcolor=#ffbbbb
| 21 || April 28 || Phillies || 3–6 || || || || || 10–11
|- bgcolor=#ccffcc
| 22 || April 29 || Phillies || 5–4 || || || || || 11–11
|- bgcolor=#ccffcc
| 23 || April 30 || Cubs || 4–3 || || || || || 12–11
|-

|- bgcolor=#ffbbbb
| 24 || May 1 || Cubs || 2–4 || || || || || 12–12
|- bgcolor=#ccffcc
| 25 || May 2 || Cubs || 1–0 || || || || || 13–12
|- bgcolor=#ffbbbb
| 26 || May 3 || Cubs || 3–7 || || || || || 13–13
|- bgcolor=#ccffcc
| 27 || May 4 || @ Phillies || 6–5 || || || || || 14–13 
|- bgcolor=#ffbbbb
| 28 || May 5 || @ Phillies || 4–5 || || || || || 14–14 
|- bgcolor=#ccffcc
| 29 || May 6 || @ Phillies || 7–4 || || || || || 15–14
|- bgcolor=#ffbbbb
| 30 || May 7 || @ Expos || 2–4 || || || || || 15–15
|- bgcolor=#ffbbbb
| 31 || May 8 || @ Expos || 0–2 || || || || || 15–16
|- bgcolor=#ccffcc
| 32 || May 9 || @ Expos || 5–2 || || || || || 16–16
|- bgcolor=#ccffcc
| 33 || May 11 || Braves || 5–1 || || || || || 17–16
|- bgcolor=#ccffcc
| 34 || May 12 || Braves || 5–2 || || || || || 18–16
|- bgcolor=#ffbbbb
| 35 || May 13 || Braves || 5–6 || || || || || 18–17
|- bgcolor=#ccffcc
| 36 || May 14 || Marlins || 6–3 || || || || || 19–17
|- bgcolor=#ccffcc
| 37 || May 15 || Marlins || 4–0 || || || || || 20–17
|- bgcolor=#ffbbbb
| 38 || May 16 || Marlins || 2–3 || || || || || 20–18
|- bgcolor=#ffbbbb
| 39 || May 18 || @ Mets || 4–5 || || || || || 20–19
|- bgcolor=#ccffcc
| 40 || May 19 || @ Mets || 1–0 || || || || || 21–19
|- bgcolor=#ccffcc
| 41 || May 20 || @ Mets || 11–4 || || || || || 22–19
|- bgcolor=#ccffcc
| 42 || May 21 || @ Cubs || 7–6 || || || || || 23–19
|- bgcolor=#ffbbbb
| 43 || May 22 || @ Cubs || 1–7 || || || || || 23–20
|- bgcolor=#ffbbbb
| 44 || May 23 || @ Cubs || 3–4 || || || || || 23–21
|- bgcolor=#ffbbbb
| 45 || May 26 || Pirates || 8–11 || || || || || 23–22
|- bgcolor=#ccffcc
| 46 || May 27 || Pirates || 6–3 || || || || || 24–22
|- bgcolor=#ccffcc
| 47 || May 28 || @ Astros || 2–1 || || || || || 25–22
|- bgcolor=#ccffcc
| 48 || May 29 || @ Astros || 10–3 || || || || || 26–22
|- bgcolor=#ffbbbb
| 49 || May 30 || @ Astros || 1–7 || || || || || 26–23
|- bgcolor=#ccffcc
| 50 || May 31 || @ Pirates || 8–3 || || || || || 27–23
|-

|- bgcolor=#ccffcc
| 51 || June 1 || @ Pirates || 8–1 || || || || || 28–23
|- bgcolor=#ccffcc
| 52 || June 2 || @ Pirates || 5–3 || || || || || 29–23
|- bgcolor=#ccffcc
| 53 || June 3 || @ Pirates || 4–2 || || || || || 30–23
|- bgcolor=#ccffcc
| 54 || June 4 || Astros || 5–3 || || || || || 31–23
|- bgcolor=#ccffcc
| 55 || June 5 || Astros || 10–4 || || || || || 32–23
|- bgcolor=#ffbbbb
| 56 || June 6 || Astros || 2–3 || || || || || 32–24
|- bgcolor=#ccffcc
| 57 || June 7 || @ Cubs || 4–3 || || || || || 33–24
|- bgcolor=#ffbbbb
| 58 || June 8 || @ Cubs || 3–7 || || || || || 33–25
|- bgcolor=#ccffcc
| 59 || June 9 || @ Cubs || 12–4 || || || || || 34–25
|- bgcolor=#ffbbbb
| 60 || June 10 || @ Cubs || 3–12 || || || || || 34–26
|- bgcolor=#ccffcc
| 61 || June 11 || @ Rangers || 12–7 || || || || || 35–26
|- bgcolor=#ffbbbb
| 62 || June 12 || @ Rangers || 2–7 || || || || || 35–27
|- bgcolor=#ccffcc
| 63 || June 13 || @ Rangers || 13–2 || || || || || 36–27
|- bgcolor=#ccffcc
| 64 || June 15 || Athletics || 8–4 || || || || || 37–27
|- bgcolor=#ccffcc
| 65 || June 16 || Athletics || 6–2 || || || || || 38–27
|- bgcolor=#ccffcc
| 66 || June 17 || Athletics || 5–4 || || || || || 39–27
|- bgcolor=#ccffcc
| 67 || June 18 || Reds || 4–3 || || || || || 40–27
|- bgcolor=#ccffcc
| 68 || June 19 || Reds || 9–2 || || || || || 41–27
|- bgcolor=#ffbbbb
| 69 || June 20 || Reds || 0–6 || || || || || 41–28
|- bgcolor=#ffbbbb
| 70 || June 22 || Cubs || 4–5 || || || || || 41–29
|- bgcolor=#ccffcc
| 71 || June 23 || Cubs || 10–9 || || || || || 42–29
|- bgcolor=#ccffcc
| 72 || June 24 || Cubs || 4–0 || || || || || 43–29
|- bgcolor=#ccffcc
| 73 || June 25 || @ Royals || 5–2 || || || || || 44–29
|- bgcolor=#ccffcc
| 74 || June 26 || @ Royals || 3–1 || || || || || 45–29
|- bgcolor=#ccffcc
| 75 || June 27 || @ Royals || 10–3 || || || || || 46–29
|- bgcolor=#ffbbbb
| 76 || June 28 || @ Pirates || 1–2 || || || || || 46–30
|- bgcolor=#ffbbbb
| 77 || June 29 || @ Pirates || 0–3 || || || || || 46–31
|- bgcolor=#ffbbbb
| 78 || June 30 || @ Pirates || 5–6 || || || || || 46–32
|-

|- bgcolor=#ccffcc
| 79 || July 2 || Mariners || 11–2 || || || || || 47–32
|- bgcolor=#ccffcc
| 80 || July 3 || Mariners || 8–1 || || || || || 48–32
|- bgcolor=#ccffcc
| 81 || July 4 || Mariners || 2–1 || || || || || 49–32
|- bgcolor=#ccffcc
| 82 || July 5 || Reds || 4–1 || || || || || 50–32
|- bgcolor=#ccffcc
| 83 || July 6 || Reds || 5–3 || || || || || 51–32
|- bgcolor=#ccffcc
| 84 || July 7 || Reds || 4–2 || || || || || 52–32
|- bgcolor=#ccffcc
| 85 || July 9 || Cubs || 6–1 || || || || || 53–32
|- bgcolor=#ccffcc
| 86 || July 10 || Cubs || 5–2 || || || || || 54–32
|- bgcolor=#ffbbbb
| 87 || July 11 || Cubs || 4–8 || || || || || 54–33
|- bgcolor=#ccffcc
| 88 || July 15 || @ Reds || 7–2 || || || || || 55–33
|- bgcolor=#ccffcc
| 89 || July 16 || @ Reds || 7–5 || || || || || 56–33
|- bgcolor=#ffbbbb
| 90 || July 17 || @ Reds || 5–7 || || || || || 56–34
|- bgcolor=#ccffcc
| 91 || July 18 || @ Reds || 10–4 || || || || || 57–34
|- bgcolor=#ccffcc
| 92 || July 19 || @ Cubs || 5–4 || || || || || 58–34
|- bgcolor=#ccffcc
| 93 || July 20 || @ Cubs || 11–8 || || || || || 59–34
|- bgcolor=#ccffcc
| 94 || July 21 || Brewers || 1–0 || || || || || 60–34
|- bgcolor=#ccffcc
| 95 || July 22 || Brewers || 4–0 || || || || || 61–34
|- bgcolor=#ffbbbb
| 96 || July 23 || Giants || 2–7 || || || || || 61–35
|- bgcolor=#ffbbbb
| 97 || July 24 || Giants || 3–5 || || || || || 61–36
|- bgcolor=#ccffcc
| 98 || July 25 || Giants || 6–0 || || || || || 62–36
|- bgcolor=#ccffcc
| 99 || July 26 || @ Reds || 9–6 || || || || || 63–36
|- bgcolor=#ccffcc
| 100 || July 27 || @ Reds || 6–0 || || || || || 64–36
|- bgcolor=#ccffcc
| 101 || July 28 || @ Reds || 11–10 || || || || || 65–36
|- bgcolor=#ccffcc
| 102 || July 30 || @ Giants || 7–4 || || || || || 66–36
|- bgcolor=#ffbbbb
| 103 || July 31 || @ Giants || 7–8 || || || || || 66–37
|-

|- bgcolor=#ccffcc
| 104 || August 1 || @ Giants || 6–1 || || || || || 67–37
|- bgcolor=#ffbbbb
| 105 || August 3 || Expos || 6–10 || || || || || 67–38
|- bgcolor=#ccffcc
| 106 || August 4 || Expos || 5–4 || || || || || 68–38
|- bgcolor=#ccffcc
| 107 || August 5 || Expos || 2–1 || || || || || 69–38
|- bgcolor=#ccffcc
| 108 || August 6 || Mets || 6–4 || || || || || 70–38
|- bgcolor=#ccffcc
| 109 || August 7 || Mets || 2–1 || || || || || 71–38
|- bgcolor=#ccffcc
| 110 || August 8 || Mets || 6–2 || || || || || 72–38
|- bgcolor=#ccffcc
| 111 || August 10 || @ Marlins || 2–1 || || || || || 73–38
|- bgcolor=#ccffcc
| 112 || August 11 || @ Marlins || 1–0 || || || || || 74–38
|- bgcolor=#ffbbbb
| 113 || August 12 || @ Marlins || 2–8 || || || || || 74–39
|- bgcolor=#ccffcc
| 114 || August 13 || @ Braves || 4–1 || || || || || 75–39
|- bgcolor=#ffbbbb
| 115 || August 14 || @ Braves || 7–9 || || || || || 75–40
|- bgcolor=#ccffcc
| 116 || August 15 || @ Braves || 10–4 || || || || || 76–40
|- bgcolor=#ccffcc
| 117 || August 16 || Reds || 10–5 || || || || || 77–40
|- bgcolor=#ccffcc
| 118 || August 17 || Reds || 7–2 || || || || || 78–40
|- bgcolor=#ffbbbb
| 119 || August 18 || Reds || 4–5 || || || || || 78–41
|- bgcolor=#ffbbbb
| 120 || August 19 || Pirates || 2–3 || || || || || 78–42
|- bgcolor=#ccffcc
| 121 || August 20 (1) || Pirates || 5–4 || || || || || 79–42
|- bgcolor=#ccffcc
| 122 || August 20 (2) || Pirates || 5–3 || || || || || 80–42
|- bgcolor=#ccffcc
| 123 || August 21 || Pirates || 10–6 || || || || || 81–42
|- bgcolor=#ccffcc
| 124 || August 22 || Pirates || 11–4 || || || || || 82–42
|- bgcolor=#ffbbbb
| 125 || August 24 || @ Reds || 3–4 || || || || || 82–43
|- bgcolor=#ccffcc
| 126 || August 25 || @ Reds || 6–5 || || || || || 83–43
|- bgcolor=#ffbbbb
| 127 || August 26 || @ Reds || 0–1 || || || || || 83–44
|- bgcolor=#ccffcc
| 128 || August 27 || @ Pirates || 8–5 || || || || || 84–44
|- bgcolor=#ccffcc
| 129 || August 28 || @ Pirates || 6–4 || || || || || 85–44
|- bgcolor=#ccffcc
| 130 || August 29 || @ Pirates || 4–0 || || || || || 86–44
|- bgcolor=#ccffcc
| 131 || August 31 || Padres || 9–3 || || || || || 87–44
|-

|- bgcolor=#ccffcc
| 132 || September 1 || Padres || 4–2 || || || || || 88–44
|- bgcolor=#ccffcc
| 133 || September 2 || Padres || 7–2 || || || || || 89–44
|- bgcolor=#ccffcc
| 134 || September 3 || Dodgers || 3–0 || || || || || 90–44
|- bgcolor=#ccffcc
| 135 || September 4 || Dodgers || 5–1 || || || || || 91–44
|- bgcolor=#ccffcc
| 136 || September 5 || Dodgers || 6–5 || || || || || 92–44
|- bgcolor=#ffbbbb
| 137 || September 6 || @ Padres || 3–7 || || || || || 92–45
|- bgcolor=#ccffcc
| 138 || September 7 || @ Padres || 4–2 || || || || || 93–45
|- bgcolor=#ffbbbb
| 139 || September 8 || @ Padres || 5–10 || || || || || 93–46
|- bgcolor=#ffbbbb
| 140 || September 10 || @ Dodgers || 6–7 || || || || || 93–47
|- bgcolor=#ffbbbb
| 141 || September 11 || @ Dodgers || 5–6 || || || || || 93–48
|- bgcolor=#ccffcc
| 142 || September 12 || @ Dodgers || 7–6 || || || || || 94–48
|- bgcolor=#ffbbbb
| 143 || September 14 || Astros || 5–7 || || || || || 94–49
|- bgcolor=#ccffcc
| 144 || September 15 || Astros || 4–2 || || || || || 95–49
|- bgcolor=#ffbbbb
| 145 || September 16 || Astros || 3–8 || || || || || 95–50
|- bgcolor=#ccffcc
| 146 || September 17 || Dbacks || 4–3 || || || || || 96–50
|- bgcolor=#ccffcc
| 147 || September 18 || Dbacks || 7–0 || || || || || 97–50
|- bgcolor=#ffbbbb
| 148 || September 19 || Dbacks || 2–3 || || || || || 97–51
|- bgcolor=#ccffcc
| 149 || September 20 || @ Brewers || 7–4 || || || || || 98–51
|- bgcolor=#ffbbbb
| 150 || September 21 || @ Brewers || 4–6 || || || || || 98–52
|- bgcolor=#ccffcc
| 151 || September 22 || @ Brewers || 3–2 || || || || || 99–52
|- bgcolor=#ccffcc
| 152 || September 23 || @ Brewers || 4–2 || || || || || 100–52
|- bgcolor=#ccffcc
| 153 || September 24 || @ Rockies || 5–4 || || || || || 101–52
|- bgcolor=#ccffcc
| 154 || September 25 || @ Rockies || 10–6 || || || || || 102–52
|- bgcolor=#ccffcc
| 155 || September 26 || @ Rockies || 9–3 || || || || || 103–52
|- bgcolor=#ffbbbb
| 156 || September 27 || @ Astros || 3–10 || || || || || 103–53
|- bgcolor=#ffbbbb
| 157 || September 28 || @ Astros || 1–2 || || || || || 103–54
|- bgcolor=#ffbbbb
| 158 || September 29 || @ Astros || 4–6 || || || || || 103–55
|- bgcolor=#ffbbbb
| 159 || September 30 || Brewers || 6–7 || || || || || 103–56
|-

|- bgcolor=#ccffcc
| 160 || October 1 || Brewers || 4–1 || || || || || 104–56
|- bgcolor=#ffbbbb
| 161 || October 2 || Brewers || 1–5 || || || || || 104–57
|- bgcolor=#ccffcc
| 162 || October 3 || Brewers || 9–4 || || || || || 105–57
|-

Postseason Game Log

|- bgcolor=#ccffcc
| 1 || October 5 || Dodgers || 8–3 || || || || || 1–0
|- bgcolor=#ccffcc
| 2 || October 7 || Dodgers || 8–3 || || || || || 2–0
|- bgcolor=#ffbbbb
| 3 || October 9 || @ Dodgers || 0–4 || || || || || 2–1
|- bgcolor=#ccffcc
| 4 || October 10 || @ Dodgers || 6–2 || || || || || 3–1
|-

|- bgcolor=#ccffcc
| 1 || October 13 || Astros || 10–7 || || || || || 1–0
|- bgcolor=#ccffcc
| 2 || October 14 || Astros || 6–4 || || || || || 2–0
|- bgcolor=#ffbbbb
| 3 || October 16 || @ Astros || 2–5 || || || || || 2–1
|- bgcolor=#ffbbbb
| 4 || October 17 || @ Astros || 5–6 || || || || || 2–2
|- bgcolor=#ffbbbb
| 5 || October 18 || @ Astros || 0–3 || || || || || 2–3
|- bgcolor=#ccffcc
| 6 || October 20 || Astros || 6–4 || || || || || 3–3
|- bgcolor=#ccffcc
| 7 || October 21 || Astros || 5–2 || || || || || 4–3
|-

|- bgcolor=#ffbbbb
| 1 || October 23 || @ Red Sox || 9–11 || || || || || 0–1
|- bgcolor=#ffbbbb
| 2 || October 24 || @ Red Sox || 2–6 || || || || || 0–2
|- bgcolor=#ffbbbb
| 3 || October 26 || Red Sox || 1–4 || || || || || 0–3
|- bgcolor=#ffbbbb
| 4 || October 27 || Red Sox || 0–3 || || || || || 0–4
|-

Roster

Player stats

Batting

Starters by position
Note: Pos = Position; G = Games played; AB = At bats; H = Hits; Avg. = Batting average; HR = Home runs; RBI = Runs batted in

Other batters
Note: G = Games played; AB = At bats; H = Hits; Avg. = Batting average; HR = Home runs; RBI = Runs batted in

Pitching

Starting pitchers
Note: G = Games pitched; IP = Innings pitched; W = Wins; L = Losses; ERA = Earned run average; SO = Strikeouts

Other pitchers
Note: G = Games pitched; IP = Innings pitched; W = Wins; L = Losses; ERA = Earned run average; SO = Strikeouts

Relief pitchers
Note: G = Games pitched; W = Wins; L = Losses; SV = Saves; ERA = Earned run average; SO = Strikeouts

NLDS

In three playoff rounds in 2004, Walker combined to hit .293/.379/.707 with a pair of home runs in each tournament, setting a franchise record for home runs hit by a left-handed batter in one postseason.  Walker made his playoff debut with the Cardinals in Game 1 of the NLDS versus the Dodgers, homering twice and scoring four runs in an 8−3 Cardinals win.  He became the first Cardinal with a multi-home run game in LDS play.

St. Louis Cardinals vs. Los Angeles Dodgers
St. Louis wins series, 3-1

NLCS

In Game of the 1 National League Championship Series (NLCS) versus the Houston Astros, Walker was a home run short of hitting for the cycle.  The Cardinals proceeded to take a 2–0 Series lead before losing three straight in Houston.  Returning home for Game 6, the Cardinals took a 4–3 lead into the ninth inning, but Houston tied it up. Jim Edmonds hit a walk-off homer in the bottom of the 12th to win the game. The next night, Albert Pujols helped St. Louis win Game 7 to clinch the series with a game tying hit.  Scott Rolen brought him home on a two-run home run.  Pujols was named the series MVP.

World Series

When the Cardinals reached the World Series, Tony La Russa became the sixth manager to win pennants in both leagues, following Joe McCarthy, Yogi Berra, Alvin Dark, and the managers in the 1984 World Series, Sparky Anderson and Dick Williams. La Russa had managed the Oakland Athletics to three straight pennants between 1988 and 1990 and winning the 1989 World Series. La Russa would try to join Anderson as the only men to have managed teams to World Series championships in both leagues. La Russa wore number 10 in tribute to Anderson (who wore 10 while manager of the Cincinnati Reds) and to indicate he was trying to win the team's tenth championship.

The Cardinals met a what was a potent Red Sox squad fresh off four straight victories over the Yankees following an 0–3 deficit in the ALCS. A comeback in this fashion in any North American major sports league had previously occurred only in the NHL. The Cardinals were again without a key player for the World Series: ace pitcher Chris Carpenter, who, after going 15–5, tweaked his shoulder in September and missed the entire post-season.

Making his World Series debut in Game 1, Walker collected four hits in five at bats with a home run and two doubles.  His four-hit outing tied a Cardinals World Series record, becoming the seventh overall and first to so since Lou Brock in 1967, also against Boston.

The Cardinals were swept by the Red Sox in four games and struggled to hit, never taking a lead at any point in the series.  Pujols, Rolen, and Edmonds, the normally fearsome 3-4-5 hitters for the Cardinals, were 6-for-45 with one RBI.  The club batted .190 with a .562 OPS overall.  Walker was one of very few exceptions, batting .357 with a 1.366 OPS.  His two home runs accounted for the only two hit by the entire Cardinals team.  In the 2004 postseason, Walker scored 21 percent (14 of 68) of Cardinals runs scored.

Awards and honors
 Pujols, Rolen, and Edmonds finished third, fourth and fifth in the MVP voting, eliciting the nickname MV3.
 La Russa finished second in the NL Manager of the Year voting.

Gold Gloves
 C:  Mike Matheny
 3B:  Scott Rolen
 OF:  Jim Edmonds

Silver Sluggers
 1B:  Albert Pujols
 OF:  Jim Edmonds

NL Comeback Player of the Year
 (The Sporting News and Players' Choice Awards):  Chris Carpenter

NLCS MVP
 Albert Pujols

Farm system

References

External links
2004 St. Louis Cardinals at Baseball Reference
2004 St. Louis Cardinals team page at www.baseball-almanac.com

National League champion seasons
St. Louis Cardinals seasons
St. Louis Cardinals
National League Central champion seasons
St. Louis Cardinals